Spinicapitichthys spiniceps, the Seychelles spiny dragonet, is a species of dragonet known only from the waters around the Seychelles where it is found in weed beds.  This species grows to a length of  TL. It is the only species in the monotypic genus Spinicapitichthys which was previously considered to be a subgenus of the large genus Callionymus.

References 

S
Fish described in 1908